Elachista manni is a moth of the family Elachistidae. It is found in Austria, the Czech Republic, Slovakia, Hungary and Russia.

References

manni
Moths described in 1990
Moths of Europe